This is a list of named coronae on Venus. With a few exceptions, cytherean coronae are named after fertility and earth goddesses.

List of coronae on Venus

See also
List of montes on Venus
List of craters on Venus

References

 USGS: Venus Nomenclature: Corona

External links
 USGS: Venus Nomenclature

Surface features of Venus
Venus-related lists

it:Corona (esogeologia)#Voci correlate